was a feudal domain under the Tokugawa shogunate of Edo period Japan, located in Ise Province in what is part of now modern-day town of  Komono, Mie. It was centered around Komono jin'ya. Komono Domain was controlled by the tozama Hijikata clan throughout its history. Hijikata Toshizō, the famed leader of the pro-Tokugawa Shinsengumi during the Bakumatsu period was from a distance cadet branch of the Hijikata clan, and has no connection with this domain.

History
Hijikata Katsuuji was a Sengoku period samurai in the service of Oda Nobunaga and subsequently Toyotomi Hideyoshi and held fiefs with a kokudaka of 10,000 koku in Komono, Ise Province. However, in 1599 he was accused of complicity in a plot to assassinate Tokugawa Ieyasu, and was dispossessed and exiled to Hitachi-Ōta. He was pardoned before the Battle of Sekigahara, where he distinguished himself in combat, and was reinstated to his former domains, with a 2000 koku increase. His successor, Hijikata Katsutaka, built a jin'ya from which to rule the domain, laid out the foundations for the castle town and invited merchants to populate it. The Hijikata clan continued to rule the territory until the Meiji restoration. However, the domain's finances were always precarious, and with large expenses due to duties at Osaka and Kyoto imposed by the shogunate, coupled with poor harvests, the situation became critical by the time of Hijikata Yoshitane, the 9th daimyō, who implemented Sumptuary laws, irrigation work, and speculation on rice futures in order to achieve financial reconstruction. He also founded the domain academy "Reisawakan". Hijikata Katsuoki, the 10th daimyō developed a higher value "brand rice" and Hijikata Katsuyoshi, the 11th daimyō began the production of tea as a cash crop. During the Boshin War, although opinion in the domain was initially divided in support between the Shogunate and the Emperor, Hijikata Katsunaga, the 12th daimyō, opted to support the new Meiji government. Komono Domain, as with all other domains, was ended with the abolition of the han system in 1871.

Holdings at the end of the Edo period
As with most domains in the han system, Komono Domain consisted of several discontinuous territories calculated to provide the assigned kokudaka, based on periodic cadastral surveys and projected agricultural yields. 

Ise Province 
16 villages in Mie District
Ōmi Province
5 villages in Kurita District

List of daimyō

See also 
 List of Han
 Abolition of the han system

References

The content of this article was largely derived from that of the corresponding article on Japanese Wikipedia.

Domains of Japan
1601 establishments in Japan
1871 disestablishments in Japan
Ise Province
History of Mie Prefecture
Komono